Hitler is a collection of two volumes by Volker Ullrich. Jefferson Chase translated both volumes into English.

The books were originally published in German by S. Fischer Verlag. The first volume Hitler: Ascent, 1889-1939, published in German in 2013, was published in English in 2016 by The Bodley Head and covers up to 1939.

The second volume Hitler Vol II: Downfall 1939-45 was published in English in 2020 by the same English publisher and covers the remainder of his biography.

Michiko Kakutani of The New York Times wrote that Volume I "offers a fascinating Shakespearean parable" regarding Adolf Hitler's rise to power and highlights how Hitler advanced his political career through "demagoguery, showmanship and nativist appeals to the masses." She stated that "there is little here that is substantially new".

Background
The Bodley Head bought the English publishing rights in 2013.

Contents
Volume I has 750 pages.

Miranda Seymour of The Daily Telegraph stated that the author's portrayal of Hitler was "Janus-faced: an iron leader riddled with pitiful insecurity; a killer driven by the terror of personal oblivion."

Reception
The book became a bestseller in Germany upon its publication.

Seymour gave the first volume five stars out of five. She described it as, "A superb biography". She credited "Ullrich’s refusal to buy into the idea – assiduously fostered by the Führer himself – that Hitler was invulnerable."

Simon Heffer, also of the Telegraph, gave the second volume four of five stars, praising its use of newly available historical material and concluding that it "is one of the most impressive Hitler biographies". Heffer argued that the book, particularly in regards to the genesis of the Holocaust, "regurgitates too much of the context of the war." Heffler also criticizes some editing choices, and the usage of American English by a British publisher.

John Kampfner in The Observer wrote that it "is, by any measure, an outstanding study." Kampfner argued "the real strength of this book is in disentangling the personal story of man and monster."

See also
 Historiography of Adolf Hitler

References

External links
 Volume I Ascent and Volume II: Downfall - Penguin Books United Kingdom
 Hitler: Ascent and Hitler: Downfall - Penguin Random House
 Adolf Hitler: Die Jahre des Aufstiegs'' - S. Fischer Verlag - Page in German
  Volume 2 page - S. Fischer Verlag - German page

2013 non-fiction books
Books about Adolf Hitler
German books
S. Fischer Verlag books
The Bodley Head books